Wanlop Weerasakreck is a Thai kickboxer and Muay Thai fighter. He is a former WPMF World Super Bantamweight champion.

Biography
Wanlop started training in Muay Thai at 8 years old. He competed over 50 times until the age of 15 with some of his fights reaching side bets of 1 million baht. Wanlop left the world of Muay Thai for 3 years due to fatigue with the lifestyle. At 19 Wanlop moved to Japan to work as a Muay Thai trainer.

Wanlop resumed competition on the Japanese scene in 2003 at the NJKF Vortex II event. He lost by unanimous decision to NJKF featherweight champion Yohei Sakurai. Following this defeat which happened at 58 kg due to poor physical condition after the time off, Wanlop joined the Weerasakreck Nishikawaguchi gym and focused on losing weight. 3 months later at the NJKF Vortex III event Wanlop now fighting under the ringname Wanlop Weerasakreck defeated #1 ranked NJKF Super Bantamweight Kunitaka Fujiwara by unanimous decision.

Championships and accomplishments
M-1 MuayThai Challenge
 2004 M-1 MC Bantamweight Champion
World Professional Muaythai Federation
 2009 WPMF World Super Bantamweight Champion

Fight Record

|-  style="background:#fbb;"
| 2009-09-13 || Loss ||align=left| Arashi Fujihara || M-1 FAIRTEX SINGHA BEER Muay Thai Challenge 2009 Yod Nak Suu vol.3 || Japan || Decision (Majority) || 5|| 3:00
|-
! style=background:white colspan=9 |
|-  style="background:#cfc;"
| 2009-06-21|| Win||align=left| Choi Jin-sung || M-1 FAIRTEX SINGHA BEER Muay Thai Challenge 2009 Yod Nak Suu vol.2|| Tokyo, Japan || TKO (Doctor Stoppage)|| 1 || 2:36
|-  style="background:#cfc;"
| 2009-01-18 || Win ||align=left| Oddnoi Sor.Wongthong || Muay Lok Japan 2009 〜Saidai Saikyou no Muay THai Matsuri〜 || Tokyo, Japan || Decision (Majority) || 5|| 3:00
|-
! style=background:white colspan=9 |
|-  style="background:#cfc;"
| 2008-11-08|| Win||align=left| Nobuchika Terado ||All Japan Kickboxing Federation Krush！～Kickboxing Destruction～|| Tokyo, Japan || Decision (Unanimous) || 3 || 3:00
|-  bgcolor="#cfc"
| 2008-08-10 || Win|| align=left| Genki Yamamoto ||M-1 FAIRTEX Muay Thai Challenge Legend of Elbows 2008 〜YOD MUAY〜 || Tokyo, Japan || TKO (Doctor Stoppage)|| 2 || 2:04
|-  bgcolor="#cfc"
| 2008-07-05 || Win||align=left| Kanongsuk Weerasakreck || K-1 WORLD MAX & DREAM Presents AKASAKA FIGHT FESTIVAL || Tokyo, Japan || Decision  || 2 || 1:38
|-  bgcolor="#cfc"
| 2008-06-22 || Win||align=left| Masahiro Yamamoto || All Japan Kickboxing Federation Blitz || Tokyo, Japan || KO (left elbow) || 2 || 2:14
|-  bgcolor="#cfc"
| 2008-06-08 || Win||align=left| Hisanori Maeda || M-1 FAIRTEX SINGHA BEER Muay Thai Challenge Legend of Elbows 2008 〜MIND〜 || Tokyo, Japan || TKO (Corner Stoppage) || 1 || 2:54
|-  style="background:#cfc;"
| 2008-03-09|| Win||align=left| Nobuchika Terado ||M-1 FAIRTEX Muay Thai Challenge Legend of elbows 2008 ～CRASH～|| Japan || TKO (Dcotor Stoppage)|| 1 || 1:49
|-  style="background:#fbb;"
| 2007-10-25|| Loss ||align=left| Arashi Fujihara ||All Japan Kickboxing Federation Kick Return/Kickboxer of the best 60 Tournament ～Final Round～|| Tokyo, Japan || Decision (Unanimous) || 5|| 3:00
|-  bgcolor="#cfc"
| 2007-09-24 || Win||align=left| Takashi Yoneda || M-1 120th ANNIVERSARY OF JAPAN-THAILAND || Tokyo, Japan || TKO || 2|| 2:51
|-  bgcolor="#cfc"
| 2007-07-21 || Win||align=left| Ueyama NINJA 3000 || CHAOS MADMAX II WORLD CHAOS MADMAX || Tokyo, Japan || KO || 3 || 1:35
|-  bgcolor="#cfc"
| 2007-05-13 || Win||align=left| Takashi Yoneda || NJKF FIGHTING EVOLUTION VI 〜Shinka Suru Tatakai〜 || Tokyo, Japan || Decision (Majority)|| 5 || 3:00
|-  bgcolor="#cfc"
| 2007-03-04 || Win||align=left| Son Hong || M-1 FAIRTEX SINGHA BEER Muay Thai Challenge 〜BATTLES OF FATE 2007〜 || Tokyo, Japan || TKO (3 Knockdown)|| 1 || 2:21
|-  bgcolor="#c5d2ea"
| 2007-01-04 || Draw ||align=left| Naoki Ishikawa || All Japan Kickboxing Federation New Year Kick Festival 2007 || Tokyo, Japan ||  Decision  || 5 || 3:00
|-  bgcolor="#cfc"
| 2006-09-19 || Win||align=left| Muangson Sor.Punpanmuang || AJKF Suk Fairtex Lumpinee Stadium || Bangkok, Thailand || Decision  || 5 || 3:00
|-  bgcolor="#c5d2ea"
| 2006-06-11 || Draw|| align=left| Genki Yamamoto || All Japan Kickboxing Federation Triumph || Tokyo, Japan || Decision || 5 || 3:00
|-  bgcolor="#cfc"
| 2006-03-19 || Win||align=left| Masahiro Yamamoto || All Japan Kickboxing Federation Sword Fight 2006 || Tokyo, Japan || KO (right front kick) || 3 || 2:48
|-  style="background:#cfc;"
| 2006-01-22|| Win ||align=left| Akinari Morita || MAJKF 〜SURPRISING-1〜 || Tokyo, Japan || TKO (Doctor Stoppage) || 1|| 1:32
|-  style="background:#cfc;"
| 2005-10-16|| Win||align=left| Arashi Fujihara ||All Japan Kickboxing Federation Sword Fight|| Tokyo, Japan || KO (Right elbow) || 2 ||0:20
|-  style="background:#cfc;"
| 2004-09-19|| Win ||align=left| Akifumi Utagawa || SHOOT BOXING WORLD TOURNAMENT S-cup 2004 || Tokyo, Japan || TKO (Doctor Stoppage) || 1|| 1:06
|-  style="background:#cfc;"
| 2004-04-11|| Win ||align=left| Atom Yamada ||  M-1 Muay Thai Challenge 3 || Tokyo, Japan || TKO (Doctor Stoppage) || 3|| 2:45
|-  style="background:#cfc;"
| 2004-01-18|| Win ||align=left| Jotanan Ludov || MAJKF SUPREME-1 〜Saikou no Kick〜 || Tokyo, Japan || Decision (Unanimous) || 5|| 3:00
|-  style="background:#cfc;"
| 2003-11-02|| Win ||align=left| Kunitaka Fujiwara || MUAY THAI CHALLENGE M-1 || Tokyo, Japan || TKO || 3|| 1:59
|-  style="background:#cfc;"
| 2003-05-16|| Win ||align=left| Kunitaka Fujiwara || NJKF VORTEX III || Tokyo, Japan || Decision (Unanimous) || 5|| 3:00
|-  style="background:#fbb;"
| 2003-03-09|| Loss ||align=left| Yohei Sakurai || NJKF VORTEX II || Tokyo, Japan || Decision (Unanimous) || 5|| 3:00
|-
| colspan=9 | Legend:

See also
List of male kickboxers

References

1983 births
Living people
Wanlop Weerasakreck
Wanlop Weerasakreck